Kalateh-ye Asad (also Romanized as Kalāteh-ye Asad) is a village in Meyami Rural District, in the Central District of Meyami County, Semnan Province, Iran. At the 2006 census, its population was 1,125, in 297 families.

References 

Populated places in Meyami County